Margaret Fink (born Margaret Elliott on March 3, 1933) is an Australian film producer, noted for her important role in the revival of Australian cinema in the 1970s.

She was educated at Sydney Girls High School, East Sydney Technical College, Sydney Teachers College and the Sydney Conservatorium. She worked as an art teacher at various high schools in Sydney from 1956 to 1961. 

Her productions include The Removalists (1975), My Brilliant Career (1979), For Love Alone (1986), Edens Lost (1988) (for TV), and Candy (2006).

She was a member of the Sydney Push, a Sydney bohemian group of the 1950s and 1960s that boasted among its membership Lillian Roxon, Germaine Greer, Clive James, and Frank Moorhouse. While still known as Margaret Elliott, she published Harry Hooton's last book, It Is Great To Be Alive. Her former husband, Leon Fink, is a prominent Sydney businessman and property developer. They married in 1961 and had three children together: Hannah, John and Ben.  After their divorce in 1978, they remained living in the same house for a number of years. She has also had relationships with Barry Humphries, Jim McNeil, Bill Harding and Richard Neville.

Her daughter, Hannah Fink, is an arts writer. John Fink is a restaurateur and filmmaker. Ben Fink was a member of the band The Whitlams.

References

Australian film producers
1933 births
Living people
People educated at Sydney Girls High School